Caresse Crosby (born Mary Phelps Jacob; April 20, 1892 – January 24, 1970) was the first recipient of a patent for the modern bra, an American patron of the arts,  publisher, and the "literary godmother to the Lost Generation of expatriate writers in Paris." She and her second husband, Harry Crosby, founded the Black Sun Press, which was instrumental in publishing some of the early works of many authors who would later become famous, among them Ernest Hemingway, Archibald MacLeish, Henry Miller, Anaïs Nin, Kay Boyle, Charles Bukowski, Hart Crane, and Robert Duncan.

Crosby's parents, William Hearn Jacob and Mary (née Phelps) Jacob, were both descended from American colonial families—her father from the Van Rensselaer family, and her mother from William Phelps. In 1915, Mary (nicknamed Polly) married Richard R. Peabody, another blue-blooded Bostonian whose family had arrived in New Hampshire in 1635. They had two children, but while her husband was away at war, she met Harry Crosby, who was seven years her junior, at a picnic in 1920. They had sex within two weeks and their public affair scandalized proper Boston society. After Richard returned from his service in World War I, he returned to drinking; his favorite pastime was to watch buildings burn. Two years later, he granted Polly a divorce, and Harry and Polly were married. They immediately left for Europe, where they joined the Lost Generation of American expatriates. They embraced a bohemian and decadent lifestyle, living off Harry's trust fund of US$12,000 a year (or about  $ in today's dollars), had an open marriage with numerous ongoing affairs, a suicide pact, frequent drug use, wild parties, and long trips abroad. At her husband's urging, Polly took the name Caresse in 1924. In 1925, they began publishing their own poetry as Éditions Narcisse in exquisitely printed, limited-edition volumes. In 1927, they re-christened the business as the Black Sun Press.

In 1929, one of her husband's affairs culminated in his death as part of a murder-suicide or double suicide. His death was marked by scandal as the newspapers speculated wildly about whether Harry shot his lover or not. Caresse returned to Paris, where she continued to run the Black Sun Press. With the prospect of war looming, she left Europe in 1936 and married Selbert Young, an unemployed, alcoholic actor 16 years her junior. They lived on a Virginia plantation they rehabilitated outside Washington, D.C., until she divorced him. She moved to Washington, D.C. and began a long-term love affair with black actor-boxer Canada Lee, despite the threat of miscegenation laws. She founded Women Against War and continued, after World War II, to try to establish a Center for World Peace at Delphi, Greece. When rebuffed by Greek authorities, she purchased Castello di Rocca Sinibalda, a 15th-century castle north of Rome, which she used to support an artists' colony. She died of pneumonia related to heart disease in Rome, in 1970.

Early life
Born on April 20, 1891, in New Rochelle, New York, she was the oldest daughter of William Hearn Jacob and Mary Phelps, the daughter of Civil War General Walter Phelps, and she had two brothers, Leonard and Walter "Bud" Phelps Jacob. She was nicknamed "Polly" to distinguish her from her mother.

Polly's family was not fabulously rich, but her father had been raised, as she put it, "to ride to hounds, sail boats, and lead cotillions", and he lived high. In 1914, she was presented to the King of England at a garden party. And in keeping with the American aristocratic style of the times, she was even photographed as a child by Charles Dana Gibson.

She grew up, she later said, "in a world where only good smells existed". "What I wanted", she said of her privileged childhood, "usually came to pass". She was a rather uninterested student. Author Geoffrey Wolff wrote that for the most part Polly "lived her life in dreams".

Her family divided its time between estates in Manhattan at 59th Street and Fifth Avenue, in Watertown, Connecticut, and in New Rochelle, New York, and she enjoyed the advantages of an upper-class lifestyle. She attended formal balls, Ivy League school dances, and formal horse riding school. She took dancing lessons at Mr. Dodsworth's Dancing Class, attended Miss Chapin's School in New York City, and then boarded at Rosemary Hall, a prep school in Wallingford, Connecticut, where she played the part of Rosalind in As You Like It to critical acclaim.

After her father's death in 1908, she lived with her mother at their home in Watertown, CT.  That same summer she met her future husband, Richard Peabody, at summer camp. Her brother Len was boarding at Westminster School, and Bud was a day student at Taft School. Approaching her own debut, she danced in "one to three balls every night" and slept from four in the morning until noon. "At twelve I was called and got ready for the customary debutante luncheon." She graduated from Rosemary Hall prep school in 1910, at age 19.

Development of the backless brassiere
In 1910, at age 19, Polly was preparing to attend a débutante ball one evening. As was customary, she put on a corset stiffened with whalebone and a restrictive, tight corset cover that flattened and jammed her large breasts together. A corset was cinched in to form as tiny a waist as possible, and the woman's torso was held very erect. A corset was very confining, and it would have been difficult to feel comfortable dressed in one. Mary wore a dress she had worn on her debut a few weeks previously, a sheer evening gown with a plunging neckline that displayed her ample cleavage.  But the corset cover, a "boxlike armour of whalebone and pink cordage," poked out from under the gown, and this time she called Marie, her personal maid. She told her, "Bring me two of my pocket handkerchiefs and some pink ribbon ... And bring the needle and thread and some pins." She fashioned the handkerchiefs and ribbon into a simple bra.

Mary's new undergarment complemented the new fashions of the time. She was mobbed after the dance by other girls who wanted to know how she moved so freely, and when she showed her new garment to friends the next day, they all wanted one. One day, she received a request for one of her contraptions from a stranger, who offered a dollar for her efforts. She knew then that this could become a viable business.

Patent granted 

Polly filed for a patent for her invention on February 12, 1914, and in November that year the United States Patent and Trademark Office granted her a patent for the 'Backless Brassiere'. Polly likened her design to corset covers which covered the bosom when a woman wore a low corset. Her design had shoulder straps which attached to the garment's upper and lower corners, and wrap-around laces attached at the lower corners which tied in the woman's front, enabling her to wear gowns cut low in the back. Polly wrote that her invention was "well-adapted to women of different size" and was "so efficient that it may be worn by persons engaged in violent exercise like tennis." Her design was lightweight, soft, and comfortable to wear, and naturally separated the breasts, unlike the corset, which was heavy, stiff, and uncomfortable, and had the effect of creating a single or "monobosom" effect.

While Crosby's design was the first granted a patent within its category, The U.S. Patent Office and foreign patent offices had issued patents for various bra-like undergarments as early as the 1860s. Other brassiere designs had previously been invented and popularized for use within the United States by about 1910.  By 1912, American mass market brassiere manufacturers included Bien Jolie Brassieres and the DeBevoise Brassiere. DeBevoise Brassiere's bust supporter was first advertised in Vogue in 1904.

Leading European couturier Lucile actively endorsed bras, and both Lucile and Paul Poiret refined and promoted the brassiere, influencing fashionable women to begin wearing their designs, Paris couturier Herminie Cadolle introduced a breast supporter in 1889. His design was a sensation at the Great Exposition of 1900 and became a fast selling design among wealthy Europeans in the next decade.

Business career
After she married Richard Peabody, Polly filed a legal certificate with the Commonwealth of Massachusetts on May 19, 1920, declaring that she was a married woman conducting a business using separate funds from her husband's bank account. She founded the Fashion Form Brassière Company and located her manufacturing shop on Washington Street in Boston, where she opened  a two-woman sweatshop that manufactured her wireless brassière during 1922. The location also served as a convenient place for romantic trysts with Harry Crosby, who would become her second husband.

In her later autobiography, The Passionate Years, she maintained that she had "a few hundred (units) of her design produced." She managed to secure a few orders from department stores, but her business never took off. Harry, who had a distaste for conventional business and a generous trust fund, discouraged her from pursuing the business and persuaded her to close it. She later sold the brassiere patent to The Warner Brothers Corset Company in Bridgeport, Connecticut, for US$1,500 (roughly equivalent to $ in current dollars). Warner manufactured the "Crosby" bra for a while, but it was not a popular style and was eventually discontinued. Warner went on to earn more than US$15 million from the bra patent over the next thirty years.

In her later years, she wrote, "I can't say the brassiere will ever take as great a place in history as the steamboat, but I did invent it."

Marriages and family life 
In 1915, Polly Jacob and Richard ("Dick") Peabody were married by his grandfather, Endicott Peabody, the founder of the Groton School, and whose family had been one of the wealthiest in America during the 19th century. By the early 20th century, a case could be made that the Peabodies had supplanted the Cabots and the Lodges as the most distinguished name in the region.

Polly found Dick's temperament to be far from her own. When they had a son, William Jacob, on February 4, 1916, she found "Dick was not the most indulgent of parents and like his father before him, he forbade the gurgles and cries of infancy; when they occurred he walked out, and often walked back unsteadily."

Polly concluded that Dick was a well-educated but undirected man, and a reluctant father. Less than a year later, he enlisted at the Mexican border and joined the Boston militia engaged in stopping Pancho Villa's cross-border raids. Less than a year after he returned home, he enlisted to fight in World War I. Their second child, a daughter, Poleen Wheatland ("Polly"), was born on August 12, 1917, but Dick was already in Officers Training Camp at Plattsburgh, New York, where he was commissioned a Second Lieutenant in the Artillery. He became a Captain in the United States Army's 15th Field Artillery, 2nd Division, American Expeditionary Force.  Polly was largely cared for by his parents, but found: "My father-in-law was a stickler for polish, both of manners and minerals." Her mother-in-law wore "nun-like dresses and in bed or out wore starched cuffs as sever as piping." Her husband, meanwhile, was enjoying life at the front as a bachelor.

Dick returned home in early 1921 and was assigned to Columbia, South Carolina. Polly and the children soon joined him, but when the war ended, Dick found himself left with nothing but a family allowance.  He suffered from his war experiences and returned to drinking heavily. Polly found he had only three real interests, all acquired at Harvard: to play, to drink, and to turn out, at any hour, to chase after fire engines and watch buildings burn. Polly's life was difficult during the war years, and when her husband returned home, significantly changed, her life soon changed abruptly, too.

Relationship with Harry Crosby 

The catalyst for Polly Jacob Peabody's transformation was her introduction and eventual marriage to Harry Crosby, a wealthy scion of a socially prominent Boston family, and another veteran and victim of the recent war. Harry attended private schools and until age 19 appeared to be well on the path to a comfortable life as a member of the upper middle class. His experiences in World War I changed everything.

In the pattern of other sons of the elite from New England, he was a volunteer in the American Field Service Ambulance Corps, along with Archibald MacLeish and Ernest Hemingway. On November 22, 1917, the ambulance he was driving was destroyed by artillery fire, but he emerged miraculously unhurt. His best friend, "Spud" Spaulding, was seriously wounded in the explosion, and Harry saved his life. The experience profoundly shaped Harry's future. He was at the Second Battle of Verdun. After the battle, his section (the 29th Infantry Division, attached to the 120th French Division) was cited for bravery, and in 1919 Crosby was one of the youngest Americans awarded the Croix de Guerre. Crosby wrote in his journal, "Most people die of a sort of creeping common sense and discover when it's too late that the only things one never regrets are one's mistakes." He vowed that he would live life on his own terms.

After returning from World War I and while completing his degree at Harvard, Harry met Polly on July 4, 1920, at an Independence Day picnic. Polly's husband Richard was in a sanitarium drying out from another drunken spell. Sensing Polly's isolation, Harry's mother Henrietta Crosby had invited Polly to chaperone Harry and some of his friends to a party, including dinner and a trip to the amusement park at Nantasket Beach. Polly was 28, married, with two small children. Harry was 22, of slight build, with an unusual blonde hair style, a pale complexion, a weak constitution, and a consuming gaze and enormous charisma. During dinner, Harry never spoke to the girl on his left, breaking decorum. By some accounts, Harry fell in love with the buxom Mrs. Peabody in about two hours. He confessed his love for her in the Tunnel of Love at the amusement park. Crosby pressed her to see him alone, an unthinkable proposition for a member of Boston's upper crust. She later wrote, "Harry was utterly ruthless ... to know Harry was a devastating experience." On July 20, they spent the night together and had sex, and two days later Polly accompanied Harry to New York. He had planned a trip to France to tour battle sites. They spent the night together in New York at the Belmont Hotel. Polly said of the night, "For the first time in my life, I knew myself to be a person."

Polly was seen by her social circle as someone who had perverted the trust placed in her as a chaperone, as an older woman who had taken advantage of a younger man. To the Crosbys, she was dishonored and corrupt. Polly and Harry's scandalous courtship was the gossip of blue-blood Boston.

In the fall, Polly's husband Dick moved back home. His parents supplied a small living allowance and Dick, Polly, and the two children moved into a three-story tenement building. Crosby lived with his father while Dick continued his studies at Harvard. While Dick worked at the bank, Harry Crosby sent crates of flowers from his mother's garden to Polly's apartment and brought over toys for the children. They drove to the shore together. Dick volunteered to join the fire department and persuaded the fire chief to wire a fire alarm bell to his home, so he could turn out at any hour. The fire chief soon let Dick go, and Dick retreated into drink again.

Crosby pursued Polly, and in May 1921, when she would not respond to his ardor, Crosby threatened suicide if Polly did not marry him. Polly's husband was in and out of sanitariums several times, fighting alcoholism. Crosby pestered Polly to tell her husband of their affair and to divorce him. In May, she revealed her adultery to Dick and suggested a separation, and he offered no resistance. Polly's mother insisted that she stop seeing Crosby for six months to avoid complete rejection by her society peers, a condition she agreed to, and she left Boston for New York. Divorce was "unheard of ... even among Boston Episcopalians." Peabody's parents were outraged that she would ask for a divorce and at her affair with Crosby. Dick's father Jacob Peabody even visited Harry's father, Stephen Crosby, on January 4, 1922, to discuss the situation, but Harry's father would not talk to him; despite his disapproval of Harry's irregular behavior, he loved his son. Stephen Crosby at first attempted to dissuade Harry from marrying Polly, and even bought him the Stutz he'd been asking for, but Harry would not be persuaded to change his mind. For her part, Polly's former friends pilloried her as an adulteress, leaving Polly stunned by the quick turn-about in their attitude towards her. Polly later described Harry's character as: "He seemed to be more expression and mood, than man," she wrote, "yet he was the most vivid personality I've ever known, electric with rebellion."

Divorce from Richard Peabody
In June 1921, she formally separated from Dick, and in December he offered to divorce her. In February 1922, Polly and Richard Peabody were legally divorced. (Dick subsequently recovered from his alcoholism and published The Common Sense of Drinking (1933). He was the first to assert there was no cure for alcoholism. His book became a best seller and was a major influence on Alcoholics Anonymous founder Bill Wilson.) Crosby had been working for eight months at Shawmut National Bank. He went on a six-day drinking spree and resigned. In May 1922, he moved to Paris to work in a job arranged for him by his family at Morgan, Harjes et Cie, the Morgan family's bank in Paris. Crosby was the nephew of Jessie Morgan, the wife of American capitalist J. P. Morgan, Jr., who was also both Richard Peabody's and Harry Crosby's godfather.

Polly had previously traveled to England to visit her cousins, where Crosby visited her. From May through July, 1922 they lived together in Paris. In July, Polly returned to the U.S. In September, Crosby proposed to Polly via transatlantic cable, and the next day bribed his way aboard the RMS Aquitania bound for New York.

Move to Paris 
 On September 9, 1922, Harry reached New York aboard the Aquitania. Polly met him at the customs barrier, and they were married in the Municipal Building in New York City that afternoon. Two days later, they re-boarded the Aquitania and moved with her children to Paris, France. Harry continued his work at Morgan, Harjes & Co., his uncle J.P. Morgan's family bank in Paris.

Polly's bubble in Paris burst when she learned shortly after their arrival that Harry had been flirting with a girl from Boston. It was the first of many flirtations and affairs that Polly would learn to live with. In early 1923, Polly introduced Harry to her friend Constance Crowninshield Coolidge. She was the niece of Frank Crowninshield, editor of Vanity Fair, and had been married to American diplomat Ray Atherton. Constance did not care what others thought about her. She loved anything risky and was addicted to gambling. She and Harry soon began a sexual relationship.

In the fall of 1923, Polly could not put up with their affair any longer and left for London. Harry told Constance that he could not meet Polly's demand that he "love her more than anyone in the world. This is absolutely impossible". But Crosby would not leave Polly, nor did Constance ask him to. But when Constance received a letter from Polly, who confessed that Constance's affair with her husband had made her "very miserable", Constance wrote Harry and told him she would not see him any more. Harry was devastated by her decision. "Your letter was bar none the worst blow I have ever received. ... I wouldn't leave her under any circumstances nor as you say would you ever marry me." But the three remained friends, and on October 1, 1924, Constance married the Count Pierre de Jumilhac, although the marriage only lasted five years. Polly appeared at least outwardly to tolerate Harry's dallying unconventional behavior, and she soon had her own courtiers. In her journals, she privately worried about Harry's continued loyalty to her.

Their glamorous and luxurious lifestyle soon included an open marriage, numerous affairs, and plenty of drugs and drinking. At the end of 1924, Harry persuaded Polly to formally change her first name. They briefly considered Clytoris before deciding on Caresse. Harry suggesting that her new name "begin with a C to go with Crosby and it must form a cross with mine." The two names intersected at right angles at the common "R," "the Crosby cross." They later named their second whippet Clytoris, explaining to Caresse's young daughter Poleen she was named after a Greek goddess.

In July 1925, Harry had sexual relations with a 14-year-old girl he nicknamed "Nubile", with a "baby face and large breasts", whom he saw at Étretat. In Morocco, during one of their trips to North Africa, Harry and Polly took a 13-year-old dancing girl named Zora to bed with them. Harry had sex with a boy of unspecified age, his only homosexual dalliance.

In 1927, in the midst of his affair with Constance, Harry and Caresse met Russian painter Polia Chentoff.  Harry asked her to paint Caresse's portrait, and he soon fell in love with Polia.  In November, Harry wrote his mother that Polia was "very beautiful and terribly serious about art she ran away from home when she was thirteen to paint." He was also in love with his cousin Nina de Polignac.

In June 1928, Harry met Josephine Rotch at the Lido in Venice, while she was shopping for her wedding trousseau, and they began an affair. In her autobiography, Caresse  minimized Harry's affair with Josephine, eliminating a number of references to her. Harry told Polly that Constance and Josephine wanted to marry him.

Expatriate life
From their arrival in 1922, the Crosbys led the life of rich expatriates. They were attracted to the bohemian lifestyle of the artists gathering in Montparnasse. They settled in an apartment at 12, Quai d'Orléans on Île St-Louis, and Polly donned her red bathing suit and rowed Harry down the river to the Place de la Concorde, where he walked the last few blocks to the bank. Harry wore his dark business suit, formal hat, and carried his umbrella and briefcase. Caresse rowed home alone, and in her swim suit her generously endowed chest drew whistles, jeers, and waves from workmen. She later wrote that she thought the exercise was good for her breasts, and she enjoyed the attention.

Harry enjoyed betting on the horse races. They had 
first experienced smoking opium in Africa, and when their friend Constance knocked on their door late one evening, they jumped at her invitation to join her at Drosso's apartment. Ready for bed, Caresse quickly put on a dress with nothing underneath. Invitations to Drosso's were restricted to a few regulars and occasional friends. The Drosso's apartment had been converted to an opium den, subdivided into small rooms filled with low couches and decorations befitting an Arabic setting. After that introduction, Harry dropped in at Drosso's frequently and sometimes stayed away from home for days at a time.

After about a year, Harry soon tired of the predictable banker's life and quit, fully joining the Lost Generation of expatriate Americans disillusioned by the restrictive atmosphere of 1920s America. They were among about 15,000–40,000 Americans living in Paris. Harry wanted as little to do with Polly's children as possible, and after the first year, her son Billy was shipped off to Cheam School in Hampshire, England.

The couple cared little for the future, spent their money recklessly, and never tried to live on a budget. This was in part because they had pledged a mutual suicide pact, in which they planned on October 31, 1942, when the earth would be closest to the sun in several decades, to jump out of an airplane together. This was to be followed by cremation and dispersal by another airplane.

Spending freely, Harry bought his silk button-hole gardenia from an exclusive tailor on rue de la Paix. Caresse bought hats from Jean Patou and dresses from Tolstoy's, an exclusive fashion house. On special occasions she wore a gold cloth evening suit, featuring a short skirt, tailored by Vionnet, one of the most important Parisian fashion houses. Although chic by Paris standards, it was unacceptable to the cousins and aunts who lived in the aristocratic neighborhood of Faubourg in Paris.

Polly and Harry purchased their first race horse in June 1924, and then two more in April 1925.  They rented a fashionable apartment at 19, Rue de Lille, and obtained a 20-year lease on a mill outside of Paris in the grounds of the Château d' Ermenonville, France, which belonged to their friend Armand de la Rochefoucauld, for 2,200 dollar gold pieces (about $ today). They named it "Le Moulin du Soleil" ("The Mill of the Sun").

In the first year there, they made friends with the 32 students who attended the Académie des Beaux-Arts, located at the end of their street. The students invited Harry and Polly to their annual Quartre Arts Ball, an invitation the couple embraced with enthusiasm. Harry fashioned a necklace of four dead pigeons, sported a red loincloth, and brought along a bag of snakes. Caresse wore a sheer chemise to her waist, a huge turquoise wig on her head, and nothing else. They both dyed their skin with red ochre. The students cheered Caresse's toplessness, and she was carried around on the shoulders of 10 students.

In January 1925 they traveled to North Africa, where they first smoked opium, a habit to which they would return again and again. In 1928, they traveled to Lebanon to visit the Temple of Baalbek.

In 1928, Harry inherited his cousin Walter Berry's considerable collection of over 8,000 mostly rare books, a collection he prized but which he also scaled back by giving away hundreds of volumes. He was known to slip rare first editions into the bookstalls that lined the Seine. Caresse took on lovers of her own, including Ortiz Manolo, Lord Lymington, Jacques Porel, Cord Meier, and in May, 1928, the Count Armand de La Rochefoucauld, son of the duke de Doudeauville, President of the Jockey Club. But behind closed doors, Harry applied a double standard, quarreling violently with Caresse about her affairs. Occasionally they strayed together, as when they met two other couples and drove to the country near Bois de Boulogne, drew the cars into a circle with their headlights on, and changed partners.

Affair with Cartier-Bresson
In 1929, Harry met Henri Cartier-Bresson at Le Bourget, where Cartier-Bresson's air squadron commandant had placed him under house arrest for hunting without a license. Crosby persuaded the officer to release Cartier-Bresson into his custody for a few days. The men found they shared an interest in photography, and they spent their time together taking and printing pictures at Crosby's home, Le Moulin du Soleil. Harry later said Cartier-Bresson "looked like a fledgling, shy and frail, and mild as whey." A friend of Crosby's from Texas encouraged Cartier-Bresson to take photography more seriously. Embracing the open sexuality offered by Crosby and his wife Caresse, Cartier-Bresson fell into an intense sexual relationship with her. In 1931, two years after Harry's suicide, the end of his affair with Caresse left Cartier-Bresson broken-hearted, and he escaped to Ivory Coast within French colonial Africa.

Publish poetry and new writers

Caresse and Harry published her first book, Crosses of Gold, in late 1924. It was a volume of conventional, "unadventurous" poetry centering on the ideas of love, beauty, and her husband.

In 1926, they published her second book, Graven Images, through Houghton Mifflin in Boston. This was the only time they used another publisher. Crosby later wrote that Harry's cousin, Walter Berry, suggested that Houghton Mifflin would publish Caresse's poetry because "they have just lost Amy Lowell".  Crosby's poetry remained relatively conventional, "still rhyming love with dove", by her own admission. A Boston Transcript reviewer said her "poetry sings", and a Literary Review contributor admired her "charming" child poems and French flavor. But a critic in the New York Herald Tribune wrote that "[f]or all its enthusiasm there is no impact to thought or phrase, the emotion is meager, the imagination bridled."

In April, 1927, they founded an English language publishing company, first called Éditions Narcisse, after their black whippet, Narcisse Noir.  They used the press as an avenue to publish their own poetry in small editions of finely-made, hard-bound volumes. Their first effort was Caresse's Painted Shores, in which she wrote about their relationship, including their reconciliation after one of his affairs. Her writing matured somewhat, and the book was more creatively organized than her prior efforts. In 1928, she wrote an epic poem which was published as The Stranger. The writing is addressed to the men in her life: her father, husband, and son. In an experimental fashion she explored the various kinds of love she had known. Later that year, Impossible Melodies explored similar themes. The Crosbys enjoyed a positive reception from their initial work and decided to expand the press to serve other authors.

They printed limited quantities of meticulously produced, hand-manufactured books, printed on high-quality paper. Publishing in Paris during the 1920s and 1930s put the company at the crossroads of many American writers who were living abroad. In 1928, Éditions Narcisse published a limited edition of 300 numbered copies of "The Fall of the House of Usher" by Edgar Allan Poe with illustrations by Alastair.

In 1928, Harry and Caresse changed the name of the press to the Black Sun Press, in keeping with Harry's fascination with death and the symbolism of the sun. Harry developed a private mythology around the sun as a symbol for both life and death, creation, and destruction. The press rapidly gained notice for publishing beautifully bound, typographically flawless editions of unusual books. They took exquisite care with the books they published, choosing the finest papers and inks.

They published early works of a number of avant-garde writers before the writers were well-known, including James Joyce's Tales Told of Shem and Shaun (which was later integrated into Finnegans Wake). They published Kay Boyle's first book-length work, Short Stories, in 1929, and works by Hart Crane, Ernest Hemingway, Eugene Jolas, D. H. Lawrence, Archibald MacLeish, Ezra Pound, and Laurence Sterne. The Black Sun Press evolved into one of the most important small presses in Paris in the 1920s. In 1929, Polly and Harry both signed poet Eugene Jolas' The Revolution of the Word Proclamation, which appeared in issue 16/17 of the literary journal transition.  After Harry died, in a suicide pact with one of his many lovers, Caresse continued publishing until 1936, when she left Europe for the United States.

Harry's suicide 
On July 9, 1928, Harry met 20-year-old Josephine Noyes Rotch, whom he would call the "Youngest Princess of the Sun" and the "Fire Princess." She was descended from a family that first settled in Provincetown, Cape Cod in 1690. Josephine would inspire Crosby's next collection of poems called Transit of Venus. Though she was several years his junior, Harry fell in love with Josephine. In a letter to his mother, dated July 24, 1928, Crosby wrote:

Josephine and Harry had an ongoing affair until she married, when the affair temporarily ended. However, Josephine rekindled their affair, and in late November 1929, Harry and Josephine met and traveled to Detroit, where they checked into an expensive, US$12 (about $ today) a day Book-Cadillac Hotel as Mr. and Mrs Harry Crane. For four days they took meals in their room, smoked opium, and had sex.

On November 29, 1929, the lovers returned to New York, where once again they attempted to end the affair, and Josephine agreed that she would return to Boston and her husband. But two days later, she had delivered a 36-line poem to Crosby, who was staying with Caresse at the Savoy-Plaza Hotel. The last line of the poem read "Death is our marriage." On December 9, Harry Crosby wrote in his journal for the last time: "One is not in love unless one desires to die with one's beloved. There is only one happiness it is to love and to be loved."

Harry was found at 10pm that night in bed at Stanley Mortimer's studio in the Hotel des Artistes. He had a .25 caliber bullet hole in his right temple next to Josephine, who had a matching hole in her left temple. They were in an affectionate embrace. Both were dressed but had bare feet. Harry sported red-painted toenails and tattoos on the bottom of his feet. The coroner said that Josephine had died at least two hours before Harry. There was no suicide note, and newspapers ran sensational articles for days about the murder-suicide or double suicide pact—they could not decide which.

Later life 

Harry left Caresse US$100,000 (about $ today) in his will, along with generous bequests to Josephine, Constance, and others. His parents Stephen and Henrietta had the will declared invalid, but reassured Caresse that she would receive US$2000 (approximately $ today) a year until she received money from Walter Berry's estate. Upon her return to Europe, Poleen was brought from Chamonix by Caresse's friend Bill Sykes, Billy was brought home from boarding school by another friend, and the family and friends spent some time at the Mill. Poleen stayed with her mother for a few months, refusing to return to school. Billy returned to Choam, and in 1931 returned to the U.S. to attend the Lenox School.

Crosby retained Mary, her birth name, and was known after her husband's death as "Mary Caresse Crosby". She pursued ambitions as an actress that she had had since her 20s, and appeared as a dancer in two short experimental films directed by artist Emlen Etting, Poem 8 (1932) and Oramunde (1933). The Black Sun Press broadened its scope after Harry's death. Although it published few works after 1952, it printed James Joyce's Collected Poems in 1963. It did not officially close until Caresse's death in 1970.

Continuation of Black Sun Press 
After Harry Crosby's suicide, Caresse dedicated herself to the Black Sun Press. She also established, with Jacques Porel, a side venture to publish paperback books when they were not yet popular, which she named Crosby Continental Editions. Ernest Hemingway, a long-time friend, offered her a choice of The Torrents of Spring (1926) or The Sun Also Rises (1926) as a  debut volume for her new venture. Caresse unfortunately picked the former, which was less well received than the other volume. She followed Hemingway's work with nine more books in 1932, including William Faulkner's Sanctuary, Kay Boyle's Year Before Last, Dorothy Parker's Laments for the Living, and Antoine de Saint-Exupéry's Night-Flight, along with works by Paul Eluard, Max Ernst, Alain Fournier, George Grosz, C. G. Jung, and Charles-Louis Philippe. After six months of sales the books had only grossed about US$1200. Crosby was unable to persuade U.S. publishers to distribute her work, as paperbacks were not yet widely distributed, and then publishers were not convinced that readers would buy them. She closed the press in 1933.

Interracial affair with Canada Lee
In 1934, she had begun a love affair with the black actor-boxer Canada Lee, despite the threat of miscegenation laws. They had lunch uptown in Harlem at the then-new restaurant Franks, where they could maintain their secret relationship. By the 1940s, Lee was a Broadway star and featured in the nationwide run of the play Native Son. But the only restaurant in Washington, D.C. where they could eat together was an African restaurant named the Bugazi.  Unlike so many of her lovers, Lee did not ask for money, even when his nightclub The Chicken Coop had a difficult time. When Crosby's brother Walter expressed his dismay at their relationship, during a dinner in the early 1940s, Caresse was offended and had little contact with Walter over the next 10 years. Crosby and Lee's intimate relationship continued into the mid-1940s and contributed to her worldview. Crosby wrote a never-published play, The Cage, transparently based on their relationship.

Marriage to Bert Saffold Young 
While taking her daughter Polly to Hollywood, where she aspired to become an actress, Caresse met Selbert "Bert" Saffold Young (1910-1971), an unemployed aspiring actor and former football player 18 years her junior. When he saw her staring at him in a restaurant, he immediately came over and asked her to dance. She described him as "handsome as Hermes" and "as militant as Mars". Her friend Constance Crowninshield Coolidge described Bert as "untamed" and "entirely ruled by impulse".

Without a job, he convinced Caresse he just wanted to own a farm, and they decided to look for land on the East Coast. They drove into Virginia looking for an old plantation house smothered in roses. When their car broke down, she accidentally discovered Hampton Manor, a Hereford cattle farm with a dilapidated brick mansion on a  estate in Bowling Green, Virginia. It had been built in 1838 by John Hampton DeJarnette from plans by his friend, Thomas Jefferson. John Hampton was the brother of Virginia  Legislator Daniel Coleman DeJarnette, Sr.

On September 30, 1936, she wrote to the New York Trust Company and instructed them to send 433 shares of stock that she used to buy the property, which was in need of renovation. Polly and Bert were married in Virginia on March 24, 1937. He was always asking Caresse for money, he crashed her car, he ran up the telephone bill, and he used all her credit at the local liquor store.  Bert ended one bout of drinking with a solo trip to Florida and did not come back to Virginia until the next year.

Ghost-writing of erotica 
In Paris during 1933, Caresse had met Henry Miller. When he returned to the U.S. in 1940, he confessed to Caresse his lack of success in getting his work published. Miller's autobiographical book Tropic of Cancer was banned in the U.S. as pornographic, and he could get no other work published. She invited him to take a room in her spacious New York apartment on East 54th Street, where she infrequently lived, which he accepted, though she did not provide him with money.

Desperate for cash, Miller fell to churning out erotica on commission for an Oklahoma oil baron at a dollar per page, but after two 100-page stories that brought him US$200, he could do no more. Now he wanted to tour the United States by car and write about it. He got a US$750 advance and persuaded the oil man's agent to advance him another $200. He was preparing to leave on the trip but still had not provided the work promised. He thought then of Caresse. She was already pitching in ideas and pieces of writing to Anaïs Nin's New York City smut club for fun, not money. In her journal, Nin wrote, "Harvey Breit, Robert Duncan, George Barker, Caresse Crosby, all of us concentrating our skills in a tour de force, supplying the old man with such an abundance of perverse felicities, that now he begged for more." Caresse was facile and clever, wrote easily and quickly, with little effort.

Caresse accepted Henry's proposal. She wrote at the top the title given her by Henry Miller, Opus Pistorum (later republished as Henry's work as Under the Roofs of Paris), and started right in. Henry left for his car tour of America. Caresse churned out 200 pages, and the collector's agent asked for more. Caresse's smut was just what the oil man wanted, according to his New York agent. No literary aspirations, just plain sex. In her journal, Nin wrote, "'Less poetry,' said the voice over the telephone. 'Be specific.'" In Caresse the agent had found the basic pornographic Henry Miller.

Caresse spent some of her time while her husband, Bert Young, fell into a drunken stupor every night, churning out another 200 pages of pornography. In her diary, Nin observed that everyone who wrote pornography with her wrote out of a self that was opposite to his or her identity, but identical with his or her desire. Caresse grew up amid the social constraints imposed by her upper-class family in New York. She had a doomed and troublesome romanticism with Harry Crosby. She participated in a decade or more of intellectual lovers in Paris during the 1920s.

Political and artistic activity 
Although Bert was often drunk and infrequently home, Caresse did not lack for company. She extended an invitation to Salvador Dalí and his wife, who were long-term guests, during which he wrote much of his autobiography. In 1934, Dalí and his wife Gala attended a masquerade party in New York, hosted for them by Crosby.  Other visitors included Max Ernst, Buckminster Fuller, Stuart Kaiser, Henry Miller, Anaïs Nin, Ezra Pound, and other friends from her time in Paris. She had a brief affair with Fuller during this time.  By 1941, having divorced Bert, Caresse moved to live in Washington, D.C. full-time, where she owned a home at 2008 Q Street NW from 1937 to 1950, and she opened the Caresse Crosby Modern Art Gallery, what was then the city's only modern art gallery, at 1606 Twentieth Street, near Dupont Circle.

In December, 1943, she wrote Henry Miller to ask if he had heard about her gallery and asked if he would be interested in exhibiting some of his paintings there. In 1944, she spent some time with him at his home in Big Sur and later opened his first one-man art show at her gallery.

Publication of Portfolio
She also published under the Black Sun Press Portfolio: An Intercontinental Quarterly, in which she sought to continue her work with young and avant-garde writers and artists. She printed issues 1, 3, and 5 in the U.S. The second issue was published in Paris in December 1945, less than seven months after the end of World War II. It featured primarily French writers and artists; the fourth issue was published in Rome and focused on Italian writers and artists; and the last issue was focused on Greek artists and writers.

During the war and for some time afterward, paper was in short supply. Caresse printed 1,000 copies of each issue, and as she had done with the Black Sun Press, gave special treatment to 100 or so deluxe copies that featured original artwork by Romare Bearden, Matisse, and others. She secured contributions from a wide variety of well-known artists and writers, including: Louis Aragon, Kay Boyle, Gwendolyn Brooks, Sterling A. Brown, Charles Bukowski, Albert Camus (Letter to a German Friend, his first appearance in an English-language publication), Henri Cartier-Bresson,René Char, Paul Éluard, Jean Genet, Natalia Ginzburg, Victor Hugo, Weldon Kees, Robert Lowell, Henri Matisse, Henry Miller, Eugenio Montale, Anaïs Nin, Charles Olson, Pablo Picasso, Francis Ponge, Kenneth Rexroth, Arthur Rimbaud, Yannis Ritsos, Jean-Paul Sartre (The End of the War), Karl Shapiro, Stephen Spender, Leo Tolstoy, and Giuseppe Ungaretti. After the sixth issue, she ran out of funds and sponsors. This was her last major publishing effort.

Visits to Europe 
Having left Europe in 1936, she yearned to visit her daughter Polly, who had been living in London the entire time. Civilian travel was still very restricted after the war ended, and Caresse reached out to her friend Archibald Macleish, now Assistant Secretary of State, who helped her make travel arrangements and obtain a visa. She traveled aboard a military British Overseas Airways Corporation flying boat, the sole civilian passenger, hand-carrying her Elsa Schiaparelli hat box that contained Pietro Lazzari's drawings of horses and Romare Bearden's Passion of Christ watercolor series.

She learned after the war that Nazi troops set up base in her home "Le Moulin du Soleil" (the French Mill). Caresse was upset when she learned the German troops had painted over the wall that had doubled as her guest book. Ironically, along with painting over the signature of Spanish painter Salvador Dalí (he intertwined his name with that of a Pulitzer Prize-winning American writer), D. H. Lawrence (who drew a phoenix), they also painted over the signature of Eva Braun, who had signed her name when she visited Harry and Caresse, along with an Austrian big game hunter she was dating.

Post-war activity
Caresse became politically active again and founded the organizations Women Against War and Citizens of the World, which embraced the concept of a "world community", which other activists such as Buckminster Fuller also supported. Caresse continued her work to establish a world citizen's center in Delphi, Greece, where in 1942 she bought a small house that overlooked the Grove of Apollo. In October 1952, she attempted to visit her property, but she was met by armed guards at Corfu as she got off the ferry from Brindisi. The police placed her under house arrest in the Corfu Palace Hotel, and after three days they told her she was not welcome in Greece and ordered her to leave. The American consul told her that the Greek government thought she was still "considered dangerous to the economy and politics of Greece." When her plan failed, she sought to create the "World Man Center" in Cyprus, which was to include a geodesic dome designed by Fuller. This effort, too, came to naught, and she continued to search for a center for her world citizen project.

In 1953, Caresse wrote and published her autobiography, The Passionate Years. She wrote it mostly based on her personal recollection rather than a specific set of sources. It contained "many amusing and intense anecdotes ... but precious little about what was going on with him [Harry] is revealed."

Son's death
In the winter of 1954–55, Caresse's son Billy Peabody was in charge of the Paris office for American Overseas Airlines. He and his wife Josette had a small third-floor walk-up apartment on rue du Bac that they heated with a fireplace and a stove. On January 25, 1955, Billy died in his sleep of carbon monoxide poisoning, while Josette was found unconscious and revived. Caresse traveled to Paris for his funeral, between appearances at colleges where she talked about her life and the Black Sun Press.

Support of artist's colony

It had been designed by Baldassare Peruzzi and was built between 1530 and 1560 for Cardinal Alessandro Cesarini. In the 1950s she rented it, and later paid US$2,600 (about $ today) for the estate. It came with the Papal title of Principessa (Princess). She paid to electrify the castle and thus brought electricity to the neighboring village. She told a reporter that the castle had 320 rooms, "at least that's what the villagers tell me." (The deed listed 180 rooms.) Many of the rooms had  ceilings and the palace was virtually impossible to heat. "I wouldn't live here if you paid me," she told a reporter.

The residential portion of the palace contains three main apartments and two courtyards. The walls of the main hall are decorated by frescoes from the 16th century. She used the castle to support various artists, including poets' seminars. Henry Miller described Rocca Sinibalda as the "Center for Creative Arts and Humanist Living in the Abruzzi Hills." Other artists visited for a weekend or an entire season.

In 1962, filmmaker Robert Snyder made a 26-minute documentary about Caresse's history and her plans for the castle. The short film, Always Yes, Caresse  took the viewer on a tour of the castle, led by Caresse. At one point in the film, she pulled down her blouse to reveal her ample bosom. He learned about the writer's retreat when he was in Rome filming a documentary on the Sistine Chapel, The Titan; The Story of Michelangelo.

Caresse for a time divided her time between Rocca Sinibalda, which in the winter was too cold and unlivable, Hampton Manor in Bowling Green, Virginia, a home in Washington, D.C., a sprawling apartment at 137 East 54th Street in New York City, as well as a residence in Rome. In 1953, Alvin Redman published her autobiography, The Passionate Years. She put Rocca Sinibalda up for sale in 1970, shortly before she died.

Death 
Suffering from heart disease, she received what was then still-experimental open heart surgery at Mayo Clinic. She died from complications from pneumonia in Rome, Italy on January 24, 1970, aged 78.  Time described her as the "literary godmother to the Lost Generation of expatriate writers in Paris." Anaïs Nin described her as "a pollen carrier, who mixed, stirred, brewed, and concocted friendships."

But she lived long enough to see many of the aspiring writers she nurtured in the 1920s become well known and accepted authors. The bra she invented went through a number of transformations and became a standard undergarment for women all over the world. Her first two husbands and her son Bill preceded her in death. She was survived by her daughter Polleen Peabody de Mun North Drysdale and two granddaughters. Crosby was buried in the Cimetière de l'Abbaye de Longchamp, in Boulogne, département de la Vendée, Pays de la Loire, France.

Legacy
Most of her papers and manuscripts are held in the archives of the Southern Illinois University Special Collections Research Center in the Morris Library at Southern Illinois University in Carbondale, Illinois, including more than 1600 photographs from her life, along with the papers of her friends James Joyce and Kay Boyle.

In 2004, Fine Line Features optioned Andrea Berloff's first screenplay Harry & Caresse. Lasse Hallström was initially attached to direct and Leslie Holleran was attached as a producer.

Works

As author
 Crosses of Gold Éditions Narcisse, Paris, 1925
 Graven Images, Houghton Mifflin, Boston, 1926
 Painted Shores Black Sun Press, Paris, 1927
 The Stranger Black Sun Press, 1927
 Impossible Melodies Black Sun Press, 1928
 Poems for Harry Crosby Black Sun Press, 1930
 The Passionate Years Dial Press, 1953

As editor
 Portfolio: An Intercontinental Quarterly  Six editions, Washington, D. C.

See also

Maidenform

References

Further reading

External links
 
 Mary Phelps Jacob (Caresse Crosby) at Phelps Family History
 Mary Phelps Jacob Inventor of the Week Archive November 2001 (March 2003)
 "Caresse Crosby, Infield." Cosmic Baseball Association, 1998 (December 2003)
 Mary Phelps Jacob, Inventor of the Modern Brassiere
 Caresse Crosby Papers  at Southern Illinois University Carbondale Special Collections Research Center
 The Crosbys: literature's most scandalous couple
  (Video)

This article was originally based upon material originally written by Brian Phelps and licensed for use in Wikipedia under the GFDL.

1890s births
1970 deaths
American expatriates in France
American debutantes
American socialites
American fashion designers
American women fashion designers
American book publishers (people)
Businesspeople from New Rochelle, New York
People from Bowling Green, Virginia
Artists from Washington, D.C.
Chapin School (Manhattan) alumni
Choate Rosemary Hall alumni
Women inventors
People from Watertown, Connecticut
Van Rensselaer family